Fernand Melgar (born 1961 in Tangier) is a Swiss actor, producer, director and film editor. The son of Spanish immigrants, Melgar has lived in Lausanne since 1963. Melgar's documentary The Fortress garnered eleven international film festival awards.

Filmography (documentaries) 
 1983 Performances au Musée Deutsch
 1986 Le musée imaginaire
 1987 L'homme-nu
 1990 Chroniques cathodiques (co-director)
 1991 Je zappe donc je suis
 1993 Album de famille
 1997 Fou du jeu (film collective "Les frissons du hasard")
 1998 Classe d'accueil
 2000-2003 Collection Premier Jour ( Le Combat, L'Arrivée, L'Apprentissage, La Visite, La Vente, Le Stage, L'Attente, L'Inalpe, La Rentrée, L'Ordination)
 2002 Remue-ménage
 2003 L'histoire, c'est moi (À table, À l'arrière, “J”]
 2005
 Le puits
 EXIT, le droit de mourir
 Cartographies n° 6 – La vallée de la jeunesse
 2008 The Fortress
 2011 Special Flight

Awards
2008 "Camera-stylo" award at the Rencontres internationales du documentaire de Montréal for The Fortress
2008 Grand Prize at the Tehran International Documentary Film Festival for The Fortress
2010 Silver Magnolia - Best Social Documentary at the MIDA Shanghai Festival

References

External links 
 
 Fernand Melgar in the Swiss Film Directory

1963 births
Living people
Swiss male film actors
People from Tangier
Swiss documentary filmmakers
Swiss film directors
People from Lausanne
20th-century Swiss male actors
21st-century Swiss male actors